Kulim is a district and town in the state of Kedah, Malaysia.

Kulim may also refer to:

Kulim, Iran, village in Iran
Kulim (state constituency)